State Route 660 (SR 660) is an east–west state highway in the east-central portion of Ohio. Existing entirely within Guernsey County, the western terminus of State Route 660 is at State Route 313 just east of the hamlet of Claysville.

History
State Route 660 was established in 1937 along the routing that it currently occupies.  No significant changes have taken place to the highway since its inception, other than the fact that the route that State Route 660 met at its northern terminus was originally U.S. Route 21, which has since been re-designated as an extension of State Route 209.

Major intersections

References

External links

660
Transportation in Guernsey County, Ohio